The Huanggutun incident, also known as the , was the assassination of the Fengtian warlord and Generalissimo of the Military Government of China Zhang Zuolin near Shenyang on 4 June 1928.

Zhang was killed when his personal train was destroyed by an explosion at the Huanggutun Railway Station that had been plotted and committed by the Kwantung Army of the Imperial Japanese Army. The incident delayed the Japanese invasion of Manchuria for several years until the Mukden Incident in 1931.

Background
Following the Xinhai Revolution of 1911, China dissolved in spontaneous devolution, with local officials and military leaders assuming power independent of control by the weak central government. In Northern China, the once-powerful Beiyang Army split up into various factions after the death of Yuan Shikai in 1916. Zhang Zuolin, the leader of the Fengtian clique, was one of the most powerful warlords and managed to seize control of Manchuria, then consisting of nine provinces.

At the time of the First United Front in 1924, foreign support in China was generally divided as follows:
 Fengtian clique — Japan
 Zhili clique — Europe and United States
 Kuomintang — Soviet Union

The Fengtian clique's support from abroad was Japan, which had vested economic and political interests in the region dating from the end of the Russo-Japanese War and was interested in exploiting their region's largely-untapped natural resources. The Japanese Kwantung Army, based in the Kwantung Leased Territory, also had responsibility for safeguarding the South Manchurian Railway and so had troops stationed in Manchuria, providing material and logistical support for the Fengtian clique. The co-operation initially worked to the benefit of both parties. Zhang provided security for the railroad and Japanese economic interests, suppressing Manchuria's endemic banditry problem and allowing extensive Japanese investments. The Imperial Japanese Army assisted Zhang in the First and Second Zhili-Fengtian Wars, including the suppression of the anti-Fengtian uprising by General Guo Songling, a senior Fengtian clique leader. However, Zhang wanted Japan's aid only to consolidate and expand his territory, but Japan envisioned a future joint occupation of Manchuria with Zhang. After he had achieved his objectives, he tried to improve relations with the United States and the United Kingdom by allowing both countries open access to the trade, investment and economic opportunities in Manchuria that he had allowed only to the Japanese.

That change in policy came while Japan was in the midst of a severe economic crisis from the 1923 Great Kantō earthquake and successive economic depressions, and it caused both alarm and irritation in the Kwantung Army leadership. The situation was further complicated by the success of the Northern Expedition, led by Chiang Kai-shek of the National Revolutionary Army, in which the Kuomintang successively defeated Sun Chuanfang, Wu Peifu and other warlords of the Northern Faction and the Beijing government, controlled by Zhang Zuolin. The Nationalists appeared poised to restore their rule over Manchuria, which was still officially claimed as part of the Republic of China.

The Nationalists, the Communists and other elements in the Northern Expedition were then supported by the Soviet Union, which had already installed puppet governments in nearby Mongolia and Tannu Tuva.

The Japanese thought that Manchuria falling under Soviet or Nationalist domination was strategically unacceptable, and Zhang Zuolin no longer appeared trustworthy as an ally capable of maintaining a de facto independent Manchuria. Japan needed a context to establish its effective control over Manchuria without combat or foreign intervention, and it believed splitting up the Fengtian clique by the replacement of Zhang with a more co-operative leader would do so.

Events

Explosion

Zhang left Beijing to go to Shenyang by train on the night of 3 June 1928. The train traveled along the Jingfeng Railway, a route that was heavily patrolled by his own troops. The only location along the railway that was not under Zhang's control was a bridge several kilometres east of Huanggutun Railway Station on the outskirts of Shenyang, where the South Manchuria Railway crossed the Jingfeng Railway via a bridge.

Colonel Daisaku Kōmoto, a junior officer in the Kwantung Army, believed that the assassination of Zhang would be the most expeditious way of installing a new leader more amenable to Japanese demands and planned an operation without direct orders from Tokyo. Japanese China expert Tōichi Sasaki claimed that he had given Kōmoto this idea. Kōmoto's subordinate, Captain Kaneo Tōmiya, was in charge of executing the plan. The bomb itself was planted on the bridge by Sapper First Lieutenant Sadatoshi Fujii. When Zhang's train passed the bridge at 5:23 a.m. on June 4, the bomb exploded. Several of Zhang's officials, including the governor of Heilongjiang province Wu Junsheng (吳俊升), died immediately. Zhang was mortally wounded and sent back to his home in Shenyang. He died several hours later.

Aftermath
At the time of the assassination, the Kwantung Army was already in the process of grooming Yang Yuting, a senior general in the Fengtian clique, to be Zhang's successor. However, the actual assassination apparently took even the Kwantung Army leadership off guard since troops were not mobilized and the Kwantung Army could not take any advantage by blaming Zhang's Chinese enemies and using the incident as a casus belli for a Japanese military intervention. Instead, the incident was soundly condemned by the international community and by both military and civilian authorities in Tokyo itself. The emergence of Zhang's son Zhang Xueliang as successor and leader of the Fengtian clique also came as a surprise.

Consequences
The younger Zhang, to avoid any conflict with Japan and chaos that might provoke the Japanese into a military response, did not directly accuse Japan of complicity in his father's murder but instead quietly carried out a policy of reconciliation with the Nationalist government of Chiang Kai-shek, which left him as the recognized ruler of Manchuria instead of Yang Yuting. The assassination thus considerably weakened Japan's political position in Manchuria.

Furthermore, the assassination, which was conducted by low-ranking officers, did not have the prior consent of the Imperial Japanese Army General Staff Office or the civilian government. Emperor Hirohito harshly criticized the event and eventually dismissed Japanese Prime Minister Tanaka Giichi for his inability to arrest and prosecute the plotters of the incident, but he privately accepted the military's argument that doing so would be disadvantageous to Japan's military and foreign policy.

To achieve its goals in Manchuria, the Kwantung Army was forced to wait several years before creating another incident to justify the invasion of Manchuria and subsequent establishment of the puppet state of Manchukuo, under Puyi, last emperor of Qing dynasty.

See also 
 Warlord era
 Northern Expedition
 Events preceding World War II in Asia
 Jinan incident (May 1928)
 Northeast Flag Replacement (by Zhang Xueliang on 29 December 1928)
 Japanese invasion of Manchuria
 Mukden Incident (18 September 1931)

References

Citations

Sources 
 Books
 
 
 
 

Assassinations in China
Warlord Era
History of Shenyang
History of Manchuria
1928 in China
1928 in Japan
Combat incidents
1928 in international relations
War crimes in China
June 1928 events
Northern Expedition
1928 murders in China